Kheyrollah Veisi is an Iranian footballer.

Club career
Veisi joined Foolad F.C. in summer 2011.

Club career statistics

References
Kheyrollah Veisi at PersianLeague.com

1988 births
Living people
Esteghlal Ahvaz players
Foolad FC players
Iranian footballers
Association football defenders